The Zubieta Facilities, is the training ground of the Primera Division club Real Sociedad. Located in Zubieta, an enclave of San Sebastian (adjacent to the San Sebastián Hippodrome), it was opened in 2004 in its modernised form, although was originally inaugurated in 1981.

Occupying an area of 70,000 m², it was designed by architect Izaskun Larzábal.

Facilities
 
Campo José Luis Orbegozo with a capacity of 2,500 seats, is the main stadium of the Zubieta Facilities and home to Real Sociedad B, the reserve team of Real Sociedad.
2 grass pitches used by the club's youth teams.
2 artificial pitches.
2 mini grass pitches.
Service centre with gymnasium.

References

External links
Official website
Estadios de España 

Real Sociedad
Football venues in the Basque Country (autonomous community)
Zubieta
Buildings and structures in Gipuzkoa
Sports venues completed in 1981